The IEEE Task Force on Process Mining (TFPM) is a non-commercial association for process mining. The IEEE (Institute of Electrical and Electronics Engineers) Task Force on Process Mining was established in October 2009 as part of the IEEE Computational Intelligence Society at the Eindhoven University of Technology. 

The task force is supported by over 80 organizations and has around 750 members. The main goal of the task force is to promote the research, development, education, and understanding of process mining.

Goals
The goals of the Task Force on Process Mining include:
 promote the research, development, education and understanding of process mining
 make end-users, developers, consultants, and researchers aware of the state-of-the-art in process mining
 promote the use of process mining techniques and tools and stimulate new applications
 play a role in standardization efforts for logging event data (e.g., XES)
 organize tutorials, special sessions, workshops, competitions, and panels
 develop material (papers, books, online courses, movies, etc.) to inform and guide people new to the field

Activities and organization
The Task Force on Process Mining has a Steering Committee and an Advisory Board. The Steering Committee, chaired by Wil van der Aalst since its inception in 2009, defined 15 action lines. These include the organization of the annual International Process Mining Conference (ICPM) series, standardization efforts leading to the IEEE XES standard for storing and exchanging event data, and the Process Mining Manifesto which was translated into 16 languages. The Task Force on Process Mining also publishes a newsletter, provides data sets, organizes workshops and competitions, and connects researchers and practitioners.

In 2016, the IEEE Standards Association published the IEEE Standard for Extensible Event Stream (XES), which is a widely accepted file format by the process mining community.

Supporting organizations
The Task Force on Process Mining is supported by most of the process mining vendors (e.g., Celonis, Fluxicon, UiPath, QPR, ABBYY, LANA, Logpicker, Minit, Myinvenio, PAFnow, Signavio and Software AG), consultancy firms (KPMG, Deloitte, etc.), universities (e.g., RWTH, TU/e, QUT, UniBZ, and DTU), research institutes (e.g., Fraunhofer FIT), and organizations using process mining at a large scale (e.g., ABB, Bosch, and Siemens). In total, over 80 organizations support the task force and there are around 750 individual members.

See also
 Process mining
 Business process management
 Official website

References

Further reading
 Aalst, W. van der (2016). Process Mining: Data Science in Action. Springer Verlag, Berlin.
 Reinkemeyer, L. (2020). Process Mining in Action: Principles, Use Cases and Outlook. Springer Verlag, Berlin.
 IEEE Task Force on Process Mining. Process Mining Manifesto. In F. Daniel, K. Barkaoui, and S. Dustdar, editors, Business Process Management Workshops, volume 99 of Lecture Notes in Business Information Processing, pages 169–194. Springer-Verlag, Berlin, 2012 (open access). https://link.springer.com/chapter/10.1007%2F978-3-642-28108-2_19

Information science
Computer occupations
Computational fields of study
Data analysis